Schweikert is a surname. People with the surname include:

 David Schweikert (born 1962), American politician
 Margarete Schweikert (1887–1957), German composer
 Ulrike Schweikert (born 1966), German writer

See also
 Schweikert Factory, a former factory building in Łódź, Poland
 Schweiker, a surname
 Schweikart, a surname